Louise Marion Jameson (born 20 April 1951) is an English actress with a wide variety of television and theatre credits. Her roles on television have included playing Leela in Doctor Who (1977–1978), Anne Reynolds in The Omega Factor (1979), Blanche Simmons in Tenko (1981–1982), Susan Young in Bergerac (1985–1990) and Rosa di Marco in EastEnders (1998–2000). In 2022, she joined the cast of Emmerdale as Mary Goskirk, having previously appeared on the show in 1973 as Sharon Crossthwaite.

According to Screenonline, Jameson "was one of a handful of actresses who both benefited from and contributed to the opening out of roles for women on British television during the 1970s and 80s, when she became associated with a series of tough, resourceful and independent characters in genres where women had conventionally been either victims or vamps."

Biography

Early life and career
Jameson was born in Wanstead, Essex and grew up in nearby Woodford Green. Jameson attended the independent Braeside School, Buckhurst Hill. She attended the Royal Academy of Dramatic Art from the ages of seventeen to nineteen and shared a flat with fellow drama students Sherrie Hewson and Sharon Maughan before spending two years with the Royal Shakespeare Company, performing in Romeo and Juliet, The Taming of the Shrew, King Lear, Summerfolk, and Blithe Spirit. Her early TV career highlights include appearances on Emmerdale Farm in 1973 as Sharon Crossthwaite, the first character in the soap to be murdered, and roles in Z-Cars, Space: 1999 and the television film The Game in 1977. She also appeared opposite Mike Raven in the low budget British horror film Disciple of Death (1972).

Doctor Who

Jameson came to widespread attention when she was cast by director Pennant Roberts as Leela, the leather-clad companion of the Fourth Doctor in Doctor Who. The character is a warrior of the fictional Sevateem people, and was introduced in The Face of Evil (1977). Jameson's inspirations for the way that she played the character included her dog, for "her instinctive nature and tendency to slightly cock her head when she perceives something", and a neighbour's child, for "openness and naïveté". 

Jameson's costuming in the series receives much comment and some criticism from feminists, with Mark Duguid writing for Screenonline that it "said much about the failure of 1970s feminism to permeate the BBC's production or costume departments". Valerie Estelle Frankel, in her book on Women in Doctor Who, characterises Leela as "a classic warrior woman" but says that the seriousness of the character is undermined because "her provocatively cut hunting leathers and cleavage are offered to the male gaze in every episode." Patrick Mulkern of Radio Times also regarded her as "a companion to lure in adolescent lads and their dads" but, while considering her debut serial to be a "lifeless tale", he wrote that Jameson was "a wonderful find. Exuding commitment and conviction, she makes Leela earnest, warm and funny, elevating her far beyond Robert Holmes's desire for a 'Raquel Welch in the jungle'. Quite simply, she's one of the most naturally gifted actresses ever to play a companion." In 2008 Jameson said, "In a way the companion was a bit of a device when I was in Doctor Who, though I did love her feistiness and her intelligence and her aggression and her intelligence – even though she wasn't educated." 

Jameson was initially paid £120 an episode for Doctor Who, later increasing to £150 an episode. She left the series after nine serials, departing in The Invasion of Time (1978), but has since reprised the role for the Big Finish audio series, starting with Zagreus (2003). She has also appeared in the spin-off audio series Gallifrey, in which she is one of the main protagonists, and Jago and Litefoot.

After Doctor Who
Jameson went on to appear in The Omega Factor (1979) as Dr. Anne Reynolds. She later had a leading role as Blanche Simmons in the first two series of Tenko, before starring for five years in the late 1980s in Bergerac as Susan Young, Jim Bergerac's girlfriend. In the mid-1980s, she played Tania Braithwaite, Pandora's mother, in both The Secret Diary of Adrian Mole and The Growing Pains of Adrian Mole for Thames Television. In the early 1990s, she starred in the two series of Rides, and made numerous one-off appearances in various TV drama series, as well as numerous Doctor Who spin-off projects including the Children in Need special Dimensions in Time (1993). In 1995, she appeared in the RSC production of Botho Strauß's The Park. Other stage appearances include the first production of Peter Nichols's Passion Play produced at the Aldwych Theatre, London, in 1981. In 1998, Jameson began a long run in the BBC soap EastEnders as Rosa di Marco, appearing in over 200 episodes over two and a half years until August 2000. Since then, she has appeared in episodes of the BBC Scotland soap River City as Viv Roberts, as a guest artist in episodes of Doctors, Holby City and The Bill, and as a regular in Doc Martin.

Jameson continues to reprise the characters of Leela and Anne Reynolds in audio plays produced by Big Finish Productions and has also starred in Sapphire & Steel and Dark Shadows audio dramas for the same company. She has also appeared in documentaries and commentaries accompanying numerous BBC DVD releases of her Doctor Who serials. She is the subject of MJTV's The Actor Speaks Volume 5, where she discusses herself, her acting career and the various series she has been in. In 2007, Jameson toured nationally in her one-woman show, Face Value. In 2013, she starred in the play Gutted by Rikki Beadle-Blair and was nominated for Best Female Performance at the 2013 Off West End Theatre Awards (Offies). In November 2013, she appeared in the one-off 50th anniversary comedy homage The Five(ish) Doctors Reboot. In 2016, she toured in Agatha Christie's The Mousetrap, the longest running show in British theatre. In 2022, she joined the cast of Emmerdale as Mary.

Personal life 
In 1990, Jameson was married to Martin Bedford, an artist whom she had met while filming Bergerac in Jersey. They divorced in 1997. Jameson was a regular prison visitor, monitoring prisoners' welfare, during the first few years of her career; and, during the early 1970s, she met Leslie Grantham at Leyhill Prison in Gloucestershire, where he was serving 12 years of a life sentence for murder. She encouraged Grantham to become an actor.

Filmography

Film
{| class="wikitable sortable"
|-
! Year !! Title !! Role !! Notes 
|-
|1972 || Disciple of Death || Betty || 
|-
|1994 || The Terror Game || Tamora Hennessy ||
|-
|1994 || The Zero Imperative || rowspan=4|Patricia Haggard ||
|-
|1995 || The Devil of Winterborne ||
|-
|1996 || [[P.R.O.B.E.#Unnatural Selection (1995)|Unnatural Selection]] || 
|-
|1996 || Ghosts of Winterborne || 
|-
|1998 || After Celia || Corinne || 
|-
|1999 || The Last 28 || May ||
|-
|2005 || Big Night Out || Lynne || 
|-
|2012 || Run for Your Wife || Receptionist || Cameo
|-
|2017 || Crossing Over || Angela Winters || 
|-
|2018 || Modern Love || Mum || 
|}

Television

Theatre
(incomplete)
1970: The Lower Depths – Anna/Old Woman – Vanbrugh Theatre, London
1972: The Glass Menagerie – Laura – The Byre Theatre, St. Andrews
1973: Romeo and Juliet – Woman – Royal Shakespeare Theatre, Stratford-upon-Avon
1973: Richard II – Small role – Royal Shakespeare Theatre, Stratford-upon-Avon
1973: Love's Labour's Lost – Jaquenetta – Royal Shakespeare Theatre, Stratford-upon-Avon
1973: The Taming of the Shrew – Bianca Minola – Royal Shakespeare Theatre, Stratford-upon-Avon
1974: King John – Blanche of Spain – Royal Shakespeare Theatre, Stratford-upon-Avon
1974: Lear – Cordelia – The Other Place, Stratford-upon-Avon
1974: I Was Shakespeare’s Double – Anne – The Other Place, Stratford-upon-Avon
1974: Summerfolk – Sonya – Aldwych Theatre, London
1974: The Marquis of Keith – Molly Griesinger – Aldwych Theatre, London
1975: King John – Blanche of Spain – Aldwych Theatre, London
1975: Love's Labour's Lost – Jaquenetta – UK Tour
1975: Love's Labour's Lost – Jaquenetta – Aldwych Theatre, London
1975: Serjeant Musgrave's Dance – Anne – Bristol Old Vic, Bristol
1975: The Merchant of Venice – Portia – Bristol Old Vic, Bristol
1975: Hard Times – Louisa Gradgrind – Bristol Old Vic, Bristol
1976: Three Women – Main Role – Studio Theatre, Stratford-upon-Avon
1976: Private Lives – Sybil Chase – UK Tour
1978: Roots – Beatie Bryant – The Little Theatre, Bristol
1978: A View from the Bridge – Catherine – Bristol Old Vic, Bristol
1978: Arms and the Man – Raina – Bristol Old Vic, Bristol
1978: The Relapse, or, Virtue in Danger – Bernithia – Cambridge Arts Theatre, Cambridge
1979: The Country Holiday – Giacinta – Cambridge Arts Theatre, Cambridge
1979: King Lear – Regan – Oxford Playhouse, Oxford
1979: Touch and Go – Annabel Wrath – Royal Court Theatre, London
1980: All My Sons – Ann Deever – Bristol Old Vic, Bristol
1980: A Midsummer Night's Dream – Helena – Bristol Old Vic, Bristol
1980: Much Ado About Nothing – Beatrice – Oxford Playhouse, Oxford
1980: Peer Gynt – Various – Oxford Playhouse, Oxford
1980: Mephisto – Miriam Gottchalk – Oxford Playhouse, Oxford
1981: Passion Play – Kate – Aldwych Theatre, London
1981: Whose Life Is It Anyway? – Dr. Clare Scott – Churchill Theatre, Bromley
1983: Gas Light – Bella Manningham – Churchill Theatre, Bromley
1983: As You Like It – Rosalind – Regent's Park Open Air Theatre, London
1983: The Beaux' Stratagem – Mrs. Sullen – Bristol Old Vic, Bristol
1986: The Light Rough – Linda – Hampstead Theatre, Hampstead 
1987: The Doctor's Dilemma – Jennifer Dubedat – Bristol Old Vic, Bristol
1988–1989: Sticky Fingers – Roxanne – King's Head Theatre, London
1989: Blithe Spirit – Elvira – UK Tour
1990: Barbarians – Nadiezhda – Barbican Centre, London
1993: Blithe Spirit – Elvira – UK Tour
1993: Mary Stuart – Mary, Queen of Scots – Battersea Arts Centre
1995: Heartbreak House – Mrs. Hushabye – Belgrade Theatre, Coventry
1995: The Park – Titania – The Pit, London
1996–1997: Death of a Salesman – The Woman – UK Tour
2001: Confusions – Various – UK Tour
2001: The Gentle Hook – Stacey Harrison – Theatre Royal, Windsor
2001: Sex Wars – Main Role – UK Tour
2002: Murder in Paris – Denyse Simenon – UK Tour
2002: The Ghost Train – Julia Price – UK Tour
2002: Corpse! – Mrs. McGee – UK Tour
2003: Corpse! – Mrs. McGee – UK Tour
2003: Seven Deadly Sins Four Deadly Sinners – Main Role – Palace Theatre, Westcliff-on-Sea
2003: Tom, Dick & Harry – Mrs. Potter – Theatre Royal, Windsor
2004: How the Other Half Loves – Main Role – Singapore
2004: Dinner – Wynne – Richmond Theatre, London
2004: Nobody's Fool – Fran – UK Tour
2005: Love Letters – Melissa Gardner – UK Tour
2005: Funny Money – Main Role – Singapore
2005: Tom, Dick & Harry – Mrs. Potter – Duke of York's Theatre, London
2006: Sit and Shiver – Mrs. Green – New End Theatre, London
2006: Arsenic and Old Lace – Abby Brewster – UK Tour
2007: Sit and Shiver – Mrs. Green – Hackney Empire, London
2007: Bedroom Farce – Delia – UK Tour
2008: Hamlet – Gertrude – Stafford Gatehouse Theatre, Stafford
2009: Women on the Edge of HRT – Vera – UK Tour
2010: We'll Always Have Paris – Raquel – The Mill at Sonning, Sonning Eye
2010: Stop Dreamin' – Doris White – London Tour
2011: Oedipus – Jocasta – UK Tour
2011: Love's the Thing – Lady Ditchling – Brighton Fringe Festival
2012–2013: My Gay Best Friend – Raquell – UK Tour
2013: Gutted – Bridie Prospect – Theatre Royal Stratford East, London
2014: Absurd Person Singular – Marion – The Mill at Sonning, Sonning Eye
2014: A Murder Is Announced – Miss Marple – UK Tour
2014: Time and the Conways – Mrs. Conway – Nottingham Playhouse, Nottingham
2015: Noises Off – Dotty Otley – Mercury Theatre, Colchester
2015: Love, Loss, and What I Wore – Gingy – The Mill at Sonning, Sonning Eye
2015: Driving Me Round the Bend – Georgina Best – The Space Arts Centre, London
2016: The Mousetrap – Mrs. Boyle – UK Tour
2016: Rumpy Pumpy – Jean Johnson – UK Tour
2017: A Murder Is Announced – Miss Marple – UK Tour
2017: Winter Hill – Beth – The Octagon Theatre, Bolton
2018: Vincent River – Anita – Park Theatre, London
2018: Ten Times Table – Helen – The Mill at Sonning, Sonning Eye
2018: The Madness of George III – Dr. Warren – Nottingham Playhouse, Nottingham
2019: Vincent River – Anita – Park Theatre, London
2019: Macbeth – Queen Duncan – Victorian Theatre, Tunbridge Wells
2021: Tennis Elbow – Mama – Royal Lyceum Theatre, Edinburgh
2021: The Mousetrap – Mrs. Boyle – St Martin's Theatre, London

One-Woman Shows
2010–2011: Shakespeare's Mistress – Herself – UK Tour
2011: Pulling Faces – Joanne Taylor – International Tour
2020: Shakespeare's Mistress – Herself – The Grove Theatre, Eastbourne

Pantomime
2000–2001: Snow White – The Wicked Queen – Wycombe Swan, Wycombe
2003–2004: Aladdin – Slave of the Ring – The Capitol Theatre, Horsham
2004–2005: Dick Whittington and His Cat – Fairy Bow Bells – Devonshire Park Theatre, Eastbourne
2015–2016: Cinderella – Fairy Godmother – Assembly Hall Theatre, Tunbridge Wells

As director
2003: Wotcha Will – Stratford Circus, London
2015: The Man with the Golden Pen – Jermyn Street Theatre, London
2020: Revenge'' – UK Tour

References

External links 

 
 
 

1951 births
20th-century English actresses
21st-century English actresses
Actresses from London
Alumni of RADA
English soap opera actresses
English stage actresses
English television actresses
Living people
People from Wanstead